Ian Beharry (born November 28, 1991) is a Canadian pair skater. With former partner Katherine Bobak, he is the 2011 Junior Grand Prix Final silver medalist and the 2012 Canadian Junior champion. He then skated with Brittany Jones, finishing 6th at the 2013 World Junior Championships.

Career 
Early in his career, Beharry competed with Kristen Tikel and Zoey Brown.

Beharry teamed up with Katherine Bobak on February 12, 2011. In the 2011–2012 season, they won silver at their first Junior Grand Prix event in Poland and gold at their second event in Estonia, earning a berth to the 2011–12 Junior Grand Prix Final. They won the silver medal at the event and set a new Canadian junior pair record with their score of 152.65 points. Bobak and Beharry then won the 2012 Canadian Junior Championships. They finished 7th at the 2012 World Junior Championships. In April 2012, Bobak and Beharry ended their partnership.

Beharry teamed up with Brittany Jones before the 2012–13 season. They won gold and bronze medals on the JGP series and finished 6th at the JGP Final. They parted ways after finishing 6th at the 2013 World Junior Championships.

Programs

With Jones

With Bobak

With Tikel

With Brown

Competitive highlights

With Jones

With Bobak

With Tikel

With Brown

References

External links 

 
 
 
 

1991 births
Canadian male pair skaters
Living people
Sportspeople from Scarborough, Toronto